Ancylosis partitella is a species of snout moth in the genus Ancylosis. It was described by Ragonot, in 1887. It is found in Malta, Russia, Kazakhstan, Algeria, Iran, Syria, Saudi Arabia and the United Arab Emirates.

The wingspan is about 15 mm.

References

Moths described in 1887
partitella
Moths of Europe
Moths of Asia
Moths of Africa